The  ("the commentary of [composed or used in] Kāśi, i.e. Varanasi")  is a commentary on Pāṇini, attributed to Jayāditya and Vāmana, composed in c. the 7th century.

It is considered one of the great grammar texts of Sanskrit after Pāṇini's Aṣṭādhyāyī (4th century BCE), Kātyāyana's Vārtikās (6th-4th century BCE-unclear), Patanjali's Mahabhasya (2nd century BCE),  and Bhartṛhari's Vākyapadīya (6th century CE).

See also
Pāṇini
Sanskrit grammarians
Bhaṭṭikāvya
Bhaṭṭoji Dīkṣita

References
Aryendra Sharma, Kasika - a commentary on Pāṇini's grammar by Vamana and Jayaditya. Hyderabad : Osmania University, Sanskrit Academy 1969-1985.
P. Haag and V. Vergiani (eds.), Studies in the Kāśikāvṛtti : the section on pratyāhāras ; critical edition, translation and other contributions,  Firenze : Società Editrice Fiorentina ; New Delhi : Manohar, 2009, .
Apurba Chandra Barthakuria, India in the Age of the Kasikavrtti (2000).

External links
online edition

Vyakarana
7th-century Indian books